Gavin Hoover (born July 12, 1997) is an American racing cyclist, who currently rides for UCI Continental team . He rode in the men's team pursuit event at the 2018 and the 2019 UCI Track Cycling World Championships.

In June 2021, he qualified to represent the United States at the 2020 Summer Olympics.

Major results

2014
 10th Paris–Roubaix Juniors
2017
 National Track Championships
1st  Team pursuit (with Adrian Hegyvary, Daniel Holloway & Daniel Summerhill)
3rd Individual pursuit
 UCI World Cup
3rd  Team pursuit, Santiago
2018
 Pan American Track Championships
1st  Team pursuit (with Ashton Lambie, Colby Lange & Eric Young)
2nd  Individual pursuit
 National Track Championships
1st  Team pursuit (with Adrian Hegyvary, Ashton Lambie & Shane Kline)
3rd Individual pursuit
2019
 Pan American Games
1st  Team pursuit (with Ashton Lambie, John Croom & Adrian Hegyvary)
2nd  Madison
 1st  Omnium, National Track Championships
 3rd  Omnium, Pan American Track Championships
2020
 UCI World Cup
3rd  Omnium, Milton
2021
 1st  Overall UCI Track Champions League Endurance
1st  Elimination race, London
2nd  Elimination race, Palma
3rd  Scratch, Panevėžys
2022
 UCI Nations Cup
3rd  Omnium, Milton
3rd  Elimination race, Milton

References

External links
 
Team USA profile

1997 births
Living people
American male cyclists
Sportspeople from New York City
Cyclists at the 2019 Pan American Games
Pan American Games medalists in cycling
Pan American Games gold medalists for the United States
Pan American Games silver medalists for the United States
Medalists at the 2019 Pan American Games
Cyclists at the 2020 Summer Olympics
Olympic cyclists of the United States
Cyclists from New York (state)
21st-century American people